I Adore You is a 1933 British musical comedy film set in a movie studio. It was most notable for Errol Flynn appearing as an extra.

Margot Grahame was the heroine and Clifford Heatherley plays a film magnate.

The choreography was done by Ralph Reader, a protege of Busby Berkeley.

It is considered a lost film.

Plot
Norman Young (Harold French) wants to marry Margot Grahame (Margot Grahame) but her contract with a producer prohibits her from marrying during a five-year period. Norman spends millions to take over the contact.

References

External links

Lost British films
1933 films
1933 musical comedy films
Films directed by George King
British musical comedy films
British black-and-white films
1930s English-language films
1930s British films